Crannell (formerly, Bullwinkel, Bulwinkle, Crannel, and Camp Nine) is a former  settlement in Humboldt County, California.

The location was formerly a company town for sawmill workers of the Little River Redwood Company, organized in 1893 by owners in Ottawa and western New York. Company headquarters were in Tonawanda. The California sawmill commenced operations in 1908.  The post office opened in 1909 was named for property owner Conrad Bulwinkle.  In 1922 the community was renamed for Little River Redwood Company president Levi Crannell.  The town was served by the Trinidad extension of the Northwestern Pacific Railroad from 1911 to 1933. A 1925 map of Crannell presents the various saw and planning mills, as well as dams and blockades on the Little River for logging transport. The town itself featured tenement housing, offices, and a General Store.

The Hammond-Little River Redwood Company, Ltd. was formed in a 1931 merger with Hammond Lumber Company. Crannell was called Camp Nine by the Hammond Lumber Company. The Humboldt Northern Railway connection to Samoa, California was dismantled in 1948.  Hammond became a subsidiary of Georgia-Pacific Corporation in 1956.

Worker housing was razed in 1969, but the site remained in use as an equipment storage and maintenance base for forestry operations of subsequent landowners.  The site was transferred to Louisiana-Pacific Corporation during a Federal Trade Commission action initiated in 1972. Simpson Timber Company purchased the property on June 30, 1998, from Robert Lee and Patti Balke, whose family owned the land and lived there since the 1800s. Subsequently this became Green Diamond Resource Company around 2004. Green Diamond refers to the forested land as "Crannell Tree Farm".

References

Company towns in California
Populated places established in 1893
Populated places disestablished in 1969